New England Federal Credit Union (NEFCU) is a credit union headquartered in Williston, Vermont, chartered and regulated under the authority of the National Credit Union Administration (NCUA) of the U.S. federal government. Founded in 1961, NEFCU is the largest credit union in Vermont. As of 2012, NEFCU had $916 million in assets, approximately 85,000 members, and six branches.

Membership in the credit union is open to anyone who works, lives, or attends schools in Addison, Chittenden, Franklin, Grand Isle, Lamoille, or Washington County. Member deposits in NEFCU are insured for up to $250,000 through the National Credit Union Share Insurance Fund, the credit union equivalent of the Federal Deposit Insurance Corporation.

Charitable activities
NEFCU sponsors RightTrack, a financial literacy program for high school students. NEFCU hosts "Shred Fests" where members of the general public may bring documents to be shredded by a professional shredding company. In 2008, over 13 tons of documents were destroyed. NEFCU also annually awards six $3,000 college scholarships to members pursuing degrees in nursing and science.

References

External links
 Official website

Credit unions based in Vermont
Banks established in 1961
1961 establishments in Vermont